Tokyo Commodity Exchange, also known as TOCOM, is Japan's largest and one of Asia's most prominent commodity futures exchanges. TOCOM operates electronic markets for precious metals, oil, rubber and soft commodities. It offers futures and options contracts for precious metals (gold, silver, platinum and palladium); energy (crude oil, gasoline, kerosene and gas oil); natural rubber and agricultural products (soybeans, corn and azuki).

History

TOCOM was established in 1984 with the merger of the Tokyo Textile Exchange, founded in 1951, the Tokyo Rubber Exchange and the Tokyo Gold Exchange. The exchange became a for-profit shareholder-owned company in 2008.

It launched the current trading platform based on the Nasdaq OMX technology in 2009. TOCOM will use Japan Exchange Group's new derivatives trading platform, Next J-Gate, from September 2016.

References

External links 
JPX Official Website 

Commodity exchanges in Japan
Futures exchanges
Companies based in Tokyo
Financial services companies established in 1951
1951 establishments in Japan
Economy of Tokyo
Financial regulatory authorities of Japan
Japan Exchange Group